Baldwin Addition Historic District is a national historic district located at Fairmount, Grant County, Indiana. It encompasses 14 contributing buildings and 3 contributing structures in a predominantly residential section of Fairmount. It was developed between about 1857 and 1930, and includes notable examples of Queen Anne and Greek Revival style architecture. Notable buildings include the Jonathan Baldwin House (1858), John Wilson Harvey houses (1893 and 1903), and the Gothic Revival style Fairmount Wesleyan Church (1916).

It was listed on the National Register of Historic Places in 1999.

References

Historic districts on the National Register of Historic Places in Indiana
Greek Revival architecture in Indiana
Queen Anne architecture in Indiana
Gothic Revival architecture in Indiana
Historic districts in Grant County, Indiana
National Register of Historic Places in Grant County, Indiana